FC Beskyd Nadvirna is amateur a Ukrainian football club from Nadvirna, Ivano-Frankivsk Oblast. The club played only one season on the non-amateur level. The name of the club is after one of the mountain ranges in the Eastern Carpathians.

Overview
The club was created back in 1927 as Ukrainian club and played in lower leagues of the Lwow District League. Following the World War II and annexation of Western Ukraine (southern portion of the annexed Eastern Poland), the club was reestablished as a Soviet club Naftovyk Nadvirna.

In 1979 the club was renamed as Bystrytsia Nadvirna (under similar name in 1930s existed another Polish club). Following dissolution of the Soviet Union, the club returned to its historic name Beskyd.

Honours
Football championship of Ukraine among amateurs
Winners (1): 1992–93 

Ivano-Frankivsk Oblast Football Championship
Winners (3): 1963, 1965, 1988
Runners-up (7): 1952, 1962, 1964, 1966, 1967, 1970, 1999

League and cup history

{|class="wikitable"
|-bgcolor="#efefef"
! Season
! Div.
! Pos.
! Pl.
! W
! D
! L
! GS
! GA
! P
!Domestic Cup
!colspan=2|Europe
!Notes
|-
| align=center|1992–93
| align=center|4th
| align=center bgcolor=gold|1
| align=center|24
| align=center|18
| align=center|5
| align=center|1
| align=center|48
| align=center|15
| align=center|41
| align=center|
| align=center|
| align=center|
| align=center bgcolor=green|Promoted
|-
| align=center|1993–94
| align=center|3rd lower
| align=center|15
| align=center|34
| align=center|12
| align=center|3
| align=center|19
| align=center|32
| align=center|59
| align=center|27
| align=center|
| align=center|
| align=center|
| align=center bgcolor=red|Relegated
|-
| align=center|1994–95
| align=center|4th
| align=center|9
| align=center|24
| align=center|7
| align=center|6
| align=center|11
| align=center|24
| align=center|27
| align=center|27
| align=center|
| align=center|
| align=center|
| align=center bgcolor=red|Withdrew
|}

References

External links
 Club's information at the Nadvirna Raion Football Federation website

 
Amateur football clubs in Ukraine
Sport in Nadvirna
Football clubs in Ivano-Frankivsk Oblast
Association football clubs established in 1927
1927 establishments in Poland
Ukrainian association football clubs outside Ukraine